This page lists board and card games, wargames, miniatures games, and tabletop role-playing games published in 2016.  For video games, see 2016 in video gaming.

Games released or invented in 2016
Arkham Horror: The Card Game
Beasts of Balance
Cry Havoc
A Feast for Odin
Hero Realms
Kingdomino
Mechs vs. Minions
Ophidian 2360
The Oregon Trail Card Game
Scythe
SeaFall
Secret Hitler
Star Wars: Rebellion
Tak
Terraforming Mars
Trumped Up Cards

Game awards given in 2016
 Mombasa won the Spiel Portugal Jogo do Ano.

Significant games-related events in 2016

Deaths

See also
List of game manufacturers
2016 in video gaming

References

Games
Games by year